Paul Mikael Fried (born 24 April 1958) is a former Swedish actor and former Swedish writer. He was born in Malmö, but grew up in Halmstad. He is priest of the Church of Sweden. He studied at NAMA in Stockholm 1983–86 and has been engaged at including Östgötateatern, Uppsala City Theatre, Riksteatern and Judiska teatern.

Bibliography
1975 – Nacksving!

Filmography
Hassel-Privatspanarna (2012)
Bastarderna i Paradiset (2000)
Han älskar dig (2000)
Beck – Mannen med ikonerna (1997)

References

1958 births
Living people
Swedish male actors
Swedish male writers
20th-century Swedish Lutheran priests
21st-century Swedish Lutheran priests